Mongezi Wellbeloved Twala is a South African politician who has been a Member of the KwaZulu-Natal Legislature since 22 May 2019. He is the provincial Chairperson of the Economic Freedom Fighters. Twala serves on the health, co-operative governance and traditional affairs committees in the legislature.

References

External links
Hon. MW Twala at KwaZulu-Natal Legislature

Living people
Year of birth missing (living people)
Zulu people
People from KwaZulu-Natal
Members of the KwaZulu-Natal Legislature
Economic Freedom Fighters politicians
21st-century South African politicians